Cubitomoris aechmobola is a moth in the family Lecithoceridae and the only species in the genus Cubitomoris. It is found in southern China.

References

Torodorinae
Monotypic moth genera